Schärer or Schaerer is a Swiss surname. Notable people with the surname include:
 
 Céline Schärer, (born 1990), Swiss triathlete
 Erich Schärer, (born 1946), Swiss bobsledder
 Peter Schärer, Swiss bobsledder
 Willy Schärer, (1903–1982), Swiss middle-distance runner
 Ludwig Schaerer, (1785–1853), Swiss pastor and lichenologist
 Eduardo Schaerer, (1873–1941), Swiss-Paraguayan politic leader and President of Paraguay between 1912 and 1916
 Santiago Schaerer, (1834–1895), Swiss colonizer and settler
 Arturo Schaerer, (1907–1979), Paraguayan journalist and entrepreneur

Swiss-German surnames